Rentec Direct was founded in 2007 and is a property management software company that provides software applications via a software-as-a-service (SaaS) platform. Rentec Direct's software is designed for landlords and property managers. The company's headquarters is in Grants Pass, Oregon.

History 
 2007 - The initial release of Rentec Direct free software solution.
2009 - Rentec Direct was founded by Nathan Miller in the State of Oregon.
 2014 - Rentec Direct added Homes.com as rental listing partner.
 2022 - Rentec Direct acquired TrueRent, Inc.

Awards
 The Stevie Awards (American Business Awards).

 Company of the Year: Winner: 2022 (Gold), Winner: 2021 (Gold)
 Entrepreneur of the Year: Winner: 2022 (Gold), Winner: 2021 (Gold), Winner: 2019 (Bronze)
 Real Estate Company of the Year: Winner: 2018 (Gold), 2019 (Gold), 2020 (Silver)
 Real Estate Entrepreneur of the Year: Winner: 2018 (Gold), 2019 (Bronze), 2020 (Silver)

References 

Property management
Property management companies